This is a list of the number-one hits of 1963 on Italian Hit Parade Singles Chart.

See also
1963 in music
List of number-one hits in Italy

References

1963 in Italian music
1963 record charts
1963